Adisura straminea is a species of moth of the family Noctuidae first described by George Hampson in 1902. It is found in Africa, including South Africa.

References

External links 
 

Heliothinae
Moths of Africa
Moths described in 1902